O. exigua may refer to:

 Ophiothrix exigua, a brittle star
 Oplitis exigua, a mite with a single pair of spiracles positioned laterally on the body
 Oreodera exigua, a longhorn beetle
 Orthomecyna exigua, a moth endemic to Hawaii
 Oryzopsis exigua, a true grass
 Oscinella exigua, a European fly
 Osminia exigua, a clearwing moth
 Ozola exigua, a geometer moth